Imelda Anne Crawford (22 November 1920 – 17 October 1956) was a British film actress, born in Palestine of a Scottish father and an English mother, and brought up in Edinburgh.

Biography
A contemporary of Margaret Lockwood and Phyllis Calvert, Crawford is best remembered for her roles in women's pictures of the 1940s, such as Millions Like Us (1943), Two Thousand Women (1944) and They Were Sisters (1945).

She married Wallace Douglas in 1953 and died of leukaemia in London in 1956, aged 35. The Times, on 18 October 1956, reported that she was playing in Agatha Christie's The Spider's Web, at London's Savoy Theatre, when she became ill. Also, that after acting in a stage production of The Gift, about a scientist blinded by an accident, she added a codicil to her will leaving her eyes to the International Eye Bank.

Filmography

Film

Television

References

External links
 
 

1920 births
1956 deaths
Scottish actresses
British film actresses
Deaths from leukemia
Deaths from cancer in England
20th-century British actresses